The men's 10000 metres at the 2003 Asian Winter Games was held on 5 February 2003 in Hachinohe, Aomori Prefecture, Japan.

Schedule
All times are Japan Standard Time (UTC+09:00)

Records

Results
Legend
DSQ — Disqualified

References
Results

External links
Schedule

Men 10000